The 2010 Continental Indoor Football League season was the league's fifth overall season. The regular season started on Saturday March 13 with the expansion Cincinnati Commandos defeating the Miami Valley Silverbacks 38-32, and ended with the 2010 CIFL Championship Game, on June 26, 2010, at the Cincinnati Gardens in Cincinnati, Ohio where the Commandos defeated the Wisconsin Wolfpack 54-40.

In 2010, the league saw its size shrink again. This time it was from 8 teams to 6 teams, as Fort Wayne Freedom, Rock River Raptors and the Wheeling Wildcats folded following the 2009 season, and the Chicago Slaughter departed the league to join the Indoor Football League. The CIFL awarded the Cincinnati Commandos and Fort Wayne FireHawks expansion franchises, and the Milwaukee Bonecrushers moved to Chicago and became the Cardinals.

On May 26, 2010, it was announced that the Marion Mayhem ceased operations immediately. This made the league finish with only 5 teams, with the top 4 still making the playoffs.

Schedule
Since the league was back to 6 teams for the first time since 2006, they did away with divisions and went back to a ten-game schedule for each team. Every team was scheduled to play a home and away game with every team except Miami Valley, as they were competing as a travel team.

Scheduling changes
On May 26, 2010, it was announced that the Marion Mayhem ceased operations immediately. As a result of the Mayhem folding Fort Wayne, Wisconsin and Miami Valley were  awarded wins for their remaining games against Marion. Fort Wayne was awarded two wins, while Wisconsin and Miami Valley each receive one win. This was the first time that a CIFL team had failed to finish a season in which it hard started.

Regular season standings

Playoffs

Rule changes
The league adapted an 8th man on both sides of the ball after playing 7-on-7 since the league's birth in 2006.

Media
The league launched the Gameday Center on its website that would allow followers to enjoy live stats for each game. Teams were also allowed to use local media to broadcast the teams under their own terms.

Uniforms
The FireHawks only had home uniforms so teams that hosted the FireHawks wore their road uniforms against them.

Coaching changes

Pre-season

Records and milestones
Most sacks in a game: 4, Brodrick Johnson, Fort Wayne (vs. Chicago, June 5, 2010)
Most sacks in a game: 5, Thomas McKenzie, Fort Wayne (vs. Chicago, June 5, 2010)
Most shutouts in a single season: 2, Wisconsin (vs. Fort Wayne, April 16, 2010) & Fort Wayne (vs. Chicago, June 5, 2010)

Awards

Regular season awards

1st Team All-CIFL

2nd Team All-CIFL

Statistics

Passing

Rushing

Receiving

Defensive

References

External links
 CIFL Website